Danny Casas (born July 13, 1986) is a third-generation professional wrestler from Mexico. His real name is Carlos Daniel Rodríguez Casas and his nickname is "El Hampon." His grandfather, Pepe Casas, started the Casas professional wrestling tradition and has been followed by his uncles José Casas Ruiz (Negro Casas), Jorge Luis Casas Ruiz (El Felino) and Erick Francisco Casas Ruiz (Heavy Metal). His championships include the IWRG Intercontinental Tag Team Championship (with Chicano) and the IWRG Junior de Juniors Championship.

Championships and accomplishments
International Wrestling Revolution Group
IWRG Junior de Juniors Championship (1 time)
IWRG Intercontinental Tag Team Championship (1 time) – with Chicano
Rebelión de los Juniors: 2017

Luchas de Apuestas record

Notes

References

1986 births
Living people
Mexican male professional wrestlers
Professional wrestlers from Mexico City